Zielin  is a village in the administrative district of Gmina Trzebielino, within Bytów County, Pomeranian Voivodeship, in northern Poland. 

The village has a population of 484.

References

Zielin